This is a list of all players to play in the Australian Hyundai A-League for the now defunct club Northern Fury FC.

Northern Fury FC was a club which appeared in the 2009–10 and 2010–11 seasons of the Australian A-League. The club played a total of 57 matches in its two seasons in the competition, winning 12, drawing 15 and losing 30. In total, 44 players made A-League appearances for the club. in March 2011 the club was axed from the league due to financial doubts from Football Federation Australia.

Records
David Williams was the most capped Fury player, with 49 appearances for the club.
Robbie Fowler is the club's all-time top scorer, with 9 goals.

Notable players

Internationals
Northern Fury FC had 8 player with international experience play for them, including 3 Australians.
Robbie Middleby played 5 times for the Socceroos in 2002.
Robbie Fowler scored 7 goals in his 26 appearances for England. This included appearing at the 2002 FIFA World Cup.
Dyron Daal was one of eight players to play in both of the Fury's A-League seasons. Daal has made 7 international appearances for small nation Netherlands Antilles.
David Williams, another player to play in both of the Fury's seasons, has made 2 appearances for Australia.
Jeremy Brockie has played 21 times for the All Whites. He has made appearances at both the 2008 Olympics and 2010 FIFA World Cup.
Eric Akoto made over 50 appearances for Togo, scoring one goal. He was a member of the squad at the 2006 FIFA World Cup- the first FIFA World Cup for which Togo qualified. He was also on the bus involved in the Togo national football team attack.
Eugene Sseppuya has scored 2 goals in his 7 appearances for the Uganda national football team.
Shane Stefanutto has 3 Socceroos caps.

Other notable players
Ufuk Talay
Mark Hughes

Key
 The list is ordered first by date of debut, and then if necessary in alphabetical order.
 Appearances as a substitute are included.
 Statistics are correct up to and including the match played on 11 February 2022. Where a player left the club permanently after this date, his statistics are updated to his date of leaving.

Players

Captains

References
General
 
 

Specific

Players
Lists of soccer players by club in Australia
Association football player non-biographical articles